Cataegis is a genus of sea snails, marine gastropod mollusks in the family Cataegidae.

Species
Species within the genus Cataegis include:
 Cataegis celebesensis McLean & Quinn, 1987
 Cataegis finkli (Petuch, 1987)
 † Cataegis godineauensis Van Winkle, 1919
 Cataegis leucogranulatus (Fu & Sun, 2006)
 † Cataegis nakagawensis Kaim, R. G. Jenkins & Hikida, 2009 
 Cataegis pleres Vilvens, 2016
 Cataegis stroggile Vilvens, 2016
 Cataegis tallorbioides Vilvens, 2016
Species brought into synonymy
 Cataegis meroglypta McLean & Quinn, 1987: synonym of Kanoia meroglypta (McLean & Quinn, 1987) (original combination)
 Cataegis toreuta McLean & Quinn, 1987: synonym of Cataegis finkli (Petuch, 1987)

See also
 Terrestrial molluscs
 Land snail
 Land slug
 Sea snail
 Sea slug

References

 McLean J.H. & Quinn J.F. (1987). Cataegis, new genus of three new species from the continental slope (Trochidae: Cataeginae New subfamily). The Nautilus. 101(3): 111-116.
 Warén A. & Bouchet P. (1993) New records, species, genera, and a new family of gastropods from hydrothermal vents and hydrocarbon seeps. Zoologica Scripta 22: 1-90.

 
Cataegidae
Gastropod genera